Plutonian may refer to:
Plutonian, of or relating to the astronomical object Pluto
The Plutonian, a character in Irredeemable
A mineral from Pluto (as well as a species) on the TV series "Rick and Morty"

See also
Plutoid, any trans-Neptunian dwarf planet, for which the name 'plutonian' had originally been proposed